Sergey Chernyshev (born 13 May 1988) is a Russian rugby union player who generally plays as a prop represents Russia internationally.

He was included in the Russian squad for the 2019 Rugby World Cup which was held in Japan for the first time and also marks his first World Cup appearance.

Career 
Sergey made his international debut for Russia against Hong Kong on 8 November 2014.

References 

Russian rugby union players
Russia international rugby union players
Living people
1988 births
Sportspeople from Moscow
Rugby union hookers
Rugby union props